Mass Effect: Paragon Lost is a 2012 adult animated science fiction action film set in the Mass Effect science fiction universe during the events of Mass Effect 2.  It is produced by BioWare, FUNimation, T.O Entertainment and animated by Production I.G. The film was screened in select theaters on November 29, 2012. It was released for digital download on Xbox Live and PlayStation Network on December 14, 2012, and on DVD and Blu-ray on December 28, 2012.

Plot
In 2183, the human colony of Fehl Prime, a major producer of pharmaceuticals for the Systems Alliance, comes under attack by a group of Blood Pack mercenaries led by the krogan Archuk. In response, the Alliance dispatches several teams of Marines to aid the beleaguered colonists. During the landing attempt, only one Marine unit, Delta Squad, survives the crash landing of their shuttle. Lieutenant James Vega assumes command of Delta Squad after Captain Toni is incapacitated. With the aid of squadmates Kamille, Nicky, Milque, Essex, and Mason, Vega successfully kills Archuk and capture his second-in-command, Brood. In the aftermath, Admiral Steven Hackett orders Delta Squad to protect Fehl Prime from future attacks.

In 2185, Fehl Prime has recovered and the Alliance has bolstered the colony's defenses with a heavy anti-ship cannon and military-grade kinetic barriers. While installing the defenses, Delta Squad discovers an unknown alien device emitting a signal. Treeya presents her findings to Liara T'Soni, only for the communications to get jammed when Liara speculates the device being Reaper tech. As the group returns to the colony, they spot an invading Collector ship.

The Collector ship deploys Seeker Swarms to incapacitate Fehl Prime's colonists, including Captain Toni. Unable to prevent the colonists' capture, Delta Squad attempts to disable the Collector ship with the colony's anti-ship cannon, but fail when the cannon is destroyed. As Delta Squad retreats to the secure underground labs beneath the colony, Kamille is snatched away by drones and Essex is paralyzed by Seekers while defending the labs' door.

While underground, Delta Squad learns that Messner is actually a Cerberus agent who had been trying access the labs. Delta Squad also discovers a possible antidote for the Seeker Swarms' paralyzing agent, as well as Brood, who had been kept in a tank as a test subject in the labs. Without warning, the door to the labs is then torn open by a Praetorian with Kamille's body incorporated into it. Mason is killed while attempting to save Kamille, and Delta Squad is forced to retreat with Brood. Brood leads Delta Squad to his hidden ship to repay his debt to Vega. As the group lifts off aboard Brood's ship, the Praetorian emerges and gives chase, killing Nicky before perishing. Vega orders a frontal assault on the Collector ship and successfully boards it. However, Messner kills Brood, leading to Delta Squad's capture.

Now in orbit, the Collector ship incinerates the remains of the colony to cover their tracks. Deep within the ship, Messner explains to Treeya that he was the one who planted the alien device in order to lure the Collectors and capture their technology for Cerberus's benefit. He takes Treeya with him to another part of the ship, leaving Vega, Essex, and Milque locked in pods. Unbeknownst to Messner or the Collectors, a drink Vega had given everyone earlier had been spiked with the Seeker Swarm antidote, and the three are able to escape and kill their guards. Vega and Essex pursue Messner and Treeya, while Milque secures transport for their escape.

Elsewhere, Messner shows Treeya a Prothean archive built into the Collector ship and has her access it. Treeya witnesses footage of the Protheans' last stand against the Reapers, their transformation into the Collectors, and the Collectors' construction of a human-shaped Reaper at their homeworld. Messner records this information on his bracelet, only to be double-crossed by the Collectors. When Messner tries to bargain with the Collectors, Treeya steals the bracelet before escaping in a containment pod.

Vega and Essex fight the Collectors, killing them and damaging the Collector ship's controls. Essex is impaled by the claw of the ship's pilot and uses his biotics to fling them both into a chasm, where they fall to their deaths. Messner fires on Vega, but Vega disarms and stabs him. Vega demands Messner's intel on the Collectors and learns of Treeya's possession of it. Left between the choice of evacuating the colonists on a now-pilotless ship or saving Treeya and the Collector intel, Vega chooses the latter. As Treeya's pod is retrieved, the Collector ship crashes into Fehl Prime's surface and explodes, killing Captain Toni and the colonists, leaving Vega, Milque, and Treeya as the only survivors of the massacre.

On the Citadel, Vega is commended by David Anderson and Admiral Hackett, who inform him that the intel he saved was crucial, and that Commander Shepard was alive. They then give Vega a petition to join the N7 program. Some time later, the trio return to Fehl Prime to mourn the lives lost.

Voice cast

Soundtrack

The film's score was composed by Joshua R. Mosley and David Kates. Kates had previously worked on the soundtracks for Mass Effect and Mass Effect 2.

References

External links 
Official Website
Official Facebook
Official Twitter

2012 films
Japanese animated films
2010s American animated films
2012 action films
2012 direct-to-video films
2012 anime films
Animated films based on video games
Anime films based on video games
Direct-to-video animated films
Films set in the 22nd century
Funimation
Mass Effect
Production I.G
Science fiction anime and manga
Space opera
Works based on Electronic Arts video games
Films with screenplays by Henry Gilroy
2010s English-language films